Malikov is a Russian masculine surname; its feminine counterpart is Malikova. It may refer to
Aladdin Malikov (born 1982), Azerbaijanian religious philosopher
Andrey Malikov (born 1954), Soviet speed skater
Arif Malikov (1933–2019), Azerbaijani and Soviet composer.
Asif Malikov (born 1971), Azerbaijani weightlifter 
Dmitri Malikov (footballer) (born 1977), Russian footballer 
Dmitry Malikov (born 1970), Russian composer, singer, and record producer
Pavel Malikov (born 1986), Russian professional boxer
Rail Malikov (born 1985), Azerbaijani football defender 
Telman Malikov (born 1950), Azerbaijani scientist 
Valeriy Malikov (1942–2016), Ukrainian statesmen 

Russian-language surnames